Kun nainen hallitsi, rakasti ja vihasi (Finnish: When a Woman Ruled, Loved and Hated) is a collection book of historical short stories about European female monarchs by Finnish author Kaari Utrio.

1975 novels
Novels by Kaari Utrio
Tammi (company) books
20th-century Finnish novels
Finnish historical novels